Goniurosaurus varius, commonly known as the Nanling leopard gecko,  is a gecko endemic to China.

References

Goniurosaurus
Reptiles of China
Reptiles described in 2020
Endemic fauna of China